Lysimachia latifolia, sometimes called Trientalis latifolia, is a species of flowering plant in the family Primulaceae. It is known as starflower, chickweed-wintergreen, or Pacific starflower.

Description
It is a low-growing, creeping perennial reaching.
The roots are tuberous, creeping rhizomes. It has 5 to 7 whorled, lanceolate, entire leaves distributed levelly in a single group.

The flowers are white or pink flowers are borne in April or May. Calyx (the collective term for sepals) is 5- to 9-parted and persistent. Corolla (the collective term for petals) is also 5- to 9-parted, rotate, with a very short tube and elliptic-lanceolate segments. Stamens occur in the same number as the corolla lobes (5-9) and are positioned opposite them. 1-3 peduncles, 1-flowered, filiform, and ebracteate.
The ovary is one-celled. The style (gynoecium) is filiform.

Habitat
Occurs on moist, shaded slopes in deep, light soil rich in organic matter, particularly leaf mould.

Distribution
Canada: Occurs in British Columbia, Alberta, and Yukon.
United States of America: Occurs throughout Washington, Idaho, Oregon, and northern California.

Etymology

The alternative name "Indian potato" refers to a small subterranean swelling at the stem's base, which is not listed as being edible by modern sources.

References

External links
 Jepson Manual Online Trientalis latifolia Hook.

latifolia
Plants described in 1838
Flora of North America